Celebration International Church is a Pentecostal international church, a Born again denomination affiliated with the Christian Conference of Asia. This fellowship is located in Cagayan de Oro, Philippines. The church’s senior pastor, Alex Eduave,  began the church in 2000. After 5 years, the center later merged with attendance of 735 people.

Leadership
This international Pentecost congregation in Cagayan de Oro is a mother church comprising 4 tributary affiliated churches. The Principal companionship constellation has a member of about 200 people, giving it the highest attendance for a Pentecostal church in the city.

In Main constitute, the entire zones where its consist of 8 zone leaders are presiding as of the assemblage. Whereas, including every 2 pastors, 3 cell leaders and corresponding superior as of particular barangays.
Accordingly, the mass presentation of the church plays are managing one head pastor with senior pastors casting to zone pastors and other contributed members. Also, the youth body is implicated by one youth organizer dispersing to every zone youth members which also help in the running of the church services.

Affiliated countries

Ministry
Celebration International Church runs different ministries until weekend services and events. Celebration International, like other churches, runs a group structure named "cell groups". Every group has member of approximately 10-20 people meet on different places.

CIA Celebration International Academy
Under the banner of Celebration International Church, the training offered includes leadership training, contemporary praise and worship and specialized youth, children's and media ministries.

Music

The church used dominantly Hillsong Music which under English bilingual. Also plays Filipino and Cebuano composition and other original composition.

See also
Hillsong Church
Christian Conference of Asia

References

Hillsong Church
Christian denominations in the Philippines
Religion in Misamis Oriental
Pentecostal denominations in Asia